Leland Fuller (February 16, 1899 – October 9, 1962) was an American art director. He was nominated for six Academy Awards in the category Best Art Direction. He worked on more than 50 films between 1943 and 1962.

Selected filmography
Fuller was nominated for six Academy Awards for Best Art Direction:
 Laura (1944)
 On the Riviera (1951)
 Fourteen Hours (1951)
 Viva Zapata! (1952)
 The President's Lady (1953)
 Desirée (1954)

References

External links

1899 births
1962 deaths
American art directors
Artists from Riverside, California